Cemetery GIS is a necropolis in the Giza Plateau. It derives its name from its proximity to pyramid G I (Khufu). The tombs are located on the south side of that pyramid and hence the name G I South Cemetery. Reisner thought the cemetery a continuation of the G7000 cemetery which is part of the Giza East Field. The construction postdates that of mastaba G 7070 of Sneferukhaf. Junker dated the cemetery to the reign of Menkaure based on the presence of granite powder thought to derive from the dressing of the second pyramid at Giza. Reisner allows for a possible construction date dating to the reign of Khafre.

This cemetery also contains several mastabas built of stone, which date to as late as the 6th Dynasty. Tombs from the time of Menkaure include the mastabas of the royal chamberlain Khaemnefert, the King's son Khufudjedef who was master of the royal largesse, and an official named Niankhre.

Mastabas
The following are a collection of mastabas found in this cemetery. There are also many shafts without any superstructure that belong to this cemetery, but these have not been included in the table.

Unnumbered tombs from the G I S cemetery include:

See also
 Giza Necropolis - overview of the Giza necropolis.
 Giza East Field - including the Queen's Pyramids from the Khufu pyramid complex and royal cemetery G 7000
 Giza West Field - including cemeteries G 1000, G 1100, G 1200 and G 5000.

External links
 The Giza Archives Website maintained by the Museum of Fine Arts in Boston. Quote: "This website is a comprehensive resource for research on Giza. It contains photographs and other documentation from the original Harvard University - Boston Museum of Fine Arts Expedition (1904 to 1947), from recent MFA fieldwork, and from other expeditions, museums, and universities around the world.".
While still reachable the Giza Archives became Digital Giza in 2011 and is maintained by Harvard. Website can be reached here.

References

Giza pyramid complex
Archaeological sites in Egypt
Ancient Egypt
Archaeological discoveries with year of discovery missing
Cemeteries in Egypt
Necropoleis